Hippia is a genus of moths of the family Notodontidae described by Heinrich Benno Möschler in 1878.

Species
Hippia mumetes (Cramer, 1775)
Hippia vittipalpis (Walker, [1858])

Former species
Hippia insularis is now Elasmia insularis (Grote, 1866)
Hippia mandela is now Elasmia mandela (H. Druce, 1887)
Hippia packardii is now Elasmia packardii (Morrison, 1875)

References

Notodontidae